Gamo-Gofa-Dawro is an Omotic language of the Afroasiatic family spoken in the Dawro, Gamo Gofa and Wolayita Zones of the Southern Nations, Nationalities, and Peoples' Region in Ethiopia.  Varieties are spoken by the Gamo, Gofa, Dawro; Blench (2006) and Ethnologue treat these as separate languages. Zala presumably belongs here as well. Dialects of Dawro (Kullo-Konta) are Konta and Kucha. In 1992, Alemayehu Abebe collected a word-list of 322 entries for all three related dialects.

Notes

External links 

 World Atlas of Language Structures information on Gamo

Languages of Ethiopia
North Omotic languages